Tidriku (also known as Tiidriki and Tiidrigi) is an uninhabited village in Haljala Parish, Lääne-Viru County, in northern Estonia.

References

 

Villages in Lääne-Viru County